Muslim Mujahid Colony is a neighbourhood in the Karachi West district of Karachi, Pakistan, that previously was a part of Baldia Town until 2011.

There are several ethnic groups in Muslim Mujahid Colony including Muhajirs, Christians, Sindhis, Kashmiris, Seraikis, Pakhtuns, Balochis, Brahuis,
Memons, Bohras and Ismailis.

References

External links 
 Karachi Website.

Neighbourhoods of Karachi
Baldia Town